"Amárrame" is a song by Chilean singer Mon Laferte featuring Colombian singer Juanes. It released on February 10, 2017 through Universal Music Group as part of Laferte's fifth studio album La Trenza. The song was written by Laferte, produced by herself and Manuel Soto.

The song reached number two in Chile, only after Luis Fonsi's "Despacito", becoming her second best-ranking song after "El Beso", and also reached number two in Mexico, becoming her best-ranking song on that chart. It also became a success in Latin American pop charts. "Amárrame" won the Latin Grammy Award for Best Alternative Song in 2017. It was also nominated for Record of the Year and Song of the Year.

Background
The song originally was written in 2015 originally for her previous album Mon Laferte Vol. 1, but she decided not to include it because she felt the album was complete. When she was recording her fifth studio album, La Trenza, she decided to put "Amárrame" in it. and when Universal Music asked her if she wanted to sing it alone or with someone, Laferte said she would like to record the song with Juanes. Then, Laferte went to Miami to meet Juanes and they decided to record the song and music video in that city.

The song was released as single on February 10, 2017, publishing the music video on MTV and later on the platform VEVO. Simultaneously,  the song "Yo Te Qui" was released, available on download format and streaming platforms.

The single cover is featured on the first shots of the song's music video.

Composition 
"Amárrame" is a song written by Mon Laferte and interpreted by herself featuring Juanes, being described as a cumbia and Latin pop song, with elements of Andean music. The track runs at 180 BPM and is in the key of F minor. It runs at three minutes and 27 seconds.

Critical reception 
Marisa Arbona-Ruiz of NPR referred to "Amárrame" as a "crazy-sexy song", adding that it "barely reflects the full range of her voice or the diverse artistry that runs throughout this delicious album".

Commercial performance 
On the day of its release the single debuted as the best-selling iTunes song in Mexico, Chile, Costa Rica, Ecuador, Colombia and Bolivia. In addition, prior to the release "Amárrame" became in a few hours on Trending Topic on the Twitter platform and then on YouTube Trend on her native country.

"Amárrame" made her the first Chilean artist to place a single among the top five trends in Spotify World and parallel to this at number 1 in Spotify Mexico and Chile simultaneously, as well as number 1 and 4 on YouTube Chile and Mexico respectively with more than six million reproductions in less than two weeks.

On April 14, 2017, the song was the most played Chilean song on radio stations in the country since its launch, with a total of 4,135 executions according to data from the SCD (Chilean Copyright Society). Moreover, from March to date, the song in collaboration with Juanes was in second place in the general ranking, which considers both Chilean and foreign music.

"Amárrame" was the most listened to Chilean song both on the radio and on Spotify in Chile during 2017.

Accolades

Music video 
A music video recorded in Miami, Florida was uploaded on February 10, 2017, showing Laferte and Juanes interpreting the song in the city streets; it features choreographies and colorful landscapes from Miami. The music video reached over 300 million views on YouTube as February 2020.

Live performances 
Laferte performed "Amárrame" for the first time on 2017 Viña del Mar International Song Festival on February 25. Then she performed along with Juanes on the 2017 Vive Latino Festival on March 19.

Personnel 
Credits adapted from La Trenza liner notes.

Vocals

 Mon Laferte – lead vocals
 Juanes – lead vocals
 Esván Lemus – background vocals
 Jerry Velásquez – background vocals
 René Mooi – background vocals

Musicians

 Fermín Fortiz – bass guitar
 Ram – clarinet
 Enrique Lara – guitar
 Juanes – guitar
 Manuel Soto – guitar, organ
 Juan Molina – percussion
 Felipe Sanabria – saxophone
 Erick Rodríguez – trombone
 Humberto Sanabria – trumpet

Production

Manuel Soto – production
Eduardo del Águila – mixing, recording
Alan Ortiz – recording
Chalo González – recording
Dave Poler – recording

Charts

Weekly charts

Year-end charts

Certifications

References

2017 songs
2017 singles
Mon Laferte songs
Juanes songs
Male–female vocal duets
Latin Grammy Award for Best Alternative Song
Songs written by Mon Laferte